The 2011–12 Scottish Football League Third Division (also known as the 2011–12 Irn Bru Scottish Football League Third Division for sponsorship reasons) was the 17th season in the current format of 10 teams in the fourth-tier of Scottish football. The season started on 6 August 2011 and finished on 5 May 2012.

Alloa Athletic secured the Third Division title on 7 April 2012, ending their one-year spell in the bottom tier of the Scottish Football League. A second promotion place is available through the play-offs which will be contested by runners-up Queen's Park along with Stranraer, Elgin City, and Albion Rovers of the Second Division. There is no relegation from this division but East Stirlingshire finished bottom for the sixth time in 10 years.

Teams

A total of 10 teams competed in the league, including eight sides from the previous season and the two teams relegated from the 2010–11 Scottish Second Division.

Arbroath as champions of the 2010–11 season were directly promoted to the 2011–12 Scottish Second Division. Thus completing only a one-year stay in the bottom tier of the Scottish Football League. In the process, winning the club's first ever senior silverware since the club was founded in 1878 − 133 years ago. They were replaced by Peterhead who finished bottom of the 2010–11 Scottish Second Division, relegated for the first time since joining the Scottish Football League in 2000.

A second promotion place was available via a play-off tournament between the ninth-placed team of the 2010–11 Scottish Second Division, Alloa Athletic, and the sides ranked second, third and fourth of the 2010–11 Scottish Third Division; Albion Rovers, Queen's Park and Annan Athletic respectively. The play off was won by Albion Rovers who defeated Annan Athletic in the final. Alloa Athletic were therefore relegated.

Stadia and locations

A.East Stirlingshire ground shared with Stenhousemuir.

Personnel and kits

Note: Flags indicate national team as has been defined under FIFA eligibility rules. Players may hold more than one non-FIFA nationality.

League table

Results
Each team plays every other team four times in the season. In each half of the season, a team plays every opponent once at home and once away from home. The same set of fixtures is repeated for the second half of the season, bringing each team's tally of games to 36.

First half of season

Second half of season

Statistics

Top goalscorers

Hat-tricks

 4 Player scored 4 goals

Awards

References

External links
Official site
2011/2012 Scottish Third Division at Soccerway

Scottish Third Division seasons
3

4
Scot